Crocodeta erecta is a moth of the family Erebidae first described by Max Gaede in 1925. It is found in Papua New Guinea.

References

Moths described in 1925
Erebid moths of Asia
Moths of Papua New Guinea
Nudariina